The Atalante was a 40-gun  of the French Navy, launched in 1802.

In 1803 Atalante cruised in the Indian Ocean under capitaine de frégate Gaudin, in the squadron under the command of Rear Admiral Charles-Alexandre Léon Durand Linois, whose mission was to re-take the colonies of the Indian Ocean, given to English at the peace of Amiens.

At the beginning of November, the division set sail for Batavia to protect the Dutch colonies. En route, Linois destroyed the English counters in Bencoolen, capturing five ships, and sailed for the South China Sea, where the China Fleet of the British East India Company was expected. During the operation he despatched Atalante to Muscat.

Linois's squadron, without Atalante,  met the British East India Company's China Fleet in the Battle of Pulo Aura. The greater numbers and aggressive action of the British East Indiamen, some of whom flew Royal Navy flags, drove the French away. Linois returned to Batavia.

In August Linois was cruising in the Indian Ocean in Marengo, together with Atalante and Sémillante. They had been on their way to Bombay when Linois's squadron captured them.

Linois described Charlotte as being copper-sheathed, of 650 tons and 16 guns. She was carrying a cargo of rice. Upton Castle he described as being copper-sheathed, of 627 tons, and 14 guns. She was carrying a cargo of wheat and other products from Bengal. He sent both his prizes into Isle de France (Mauritius).

Atalante was also engaged at the Battle of Vizagapatam in September 1804.

Fate
On 3 November 1805 she was under the command of Captain Gaudin-Beauchêne. As she was moored near the Cape of Good Hope, a gust of wind washed her ashore. Troude reports that by 7 November she had been refloated and repaired. Accounts of her subsequent fate differ. One account has it that she was found irreparable and was written off as a total loss. However, Commodore Sir Home Popham reported that the "French Ship Atalante, of 40 Guns, and Batavian Ship Bato, of 68 Guns: Destroyed by the Enemy running them on Shore when the Cape was attacked, January 10, 1806."

Citations

References
 
 
 

Virginie-class frigates
1802 ships
Ships built in France
Maritime incidents in 1805
Maritime incidents in 1806
Shipwrecks of South Africa